The Boyfriend Club is a series of novels by Janet Quin-Harkin about the school and home adventures of four American girls, all aged around fourteen, attending Alta Mesa High School in Arizona - Ginger Hartman (the tomboy), Roni Ruiz (the crazy, outgoing one), Karen Nguyen (the studious 'geek') and Justine Craft (the spoilt snob). Despite differences in personality, the four girls become best friends and form the 'Boyfriend Club'. The twelve books in the series, published in 1994–95, explore the trials and tribulations of teenage friendships and relationships.

The Boyfriend Club books
 Ginger's First Kiss
 Roni's Dream Boy
 Karen's Perfect Match
 Queen Justine
 Ginger's New Crush
 Roni's Two-Boy Trouble
 No More Boys 
 Karen's Lessons in Love
 Roni's Sweet Fifteen
 Justine's Babysitting Nightmare 
 The Boyfriend Wars 
 Dear Karen

References

Novel series